Todd Warner (born June 6, 1971) is an American politician, who currently serves in the Tennessee House of Representatives from the 92nd district as a member of the Republican Party.

Tennessee House of Representatives
In January 2021, Warner was one of several current and former Tennessee legislators whose homes and offices were raided by the Federal Bureau of Investigation in relation to an investigation into the laundering of campaign funds. According to Warner's defense attorney, he has not been charged with any crimes.

Personal life

On August 13, 2021, a Nashville Metro water crew found Warner's nephew, James William Warner, murdered. In response, Warner described his nephew and the murder by saying "(He) loved life and loved people. It's just a tragic ending to something that should've never happened." Samuel Rich, a suspect already wanted for attempted murder and theft, also became wanted for questioning in regards to the murder, briefly being put on the TBI's Most Wanted list, before being arrested on August 15, 2021 in Bedford County, Tennessee, the same county as James William Warner lived in.

Electoral History

References

External links

21st-century American politicians
Living people
1971 births
Tennessee Republicans